Nogliki Airport  is an airport serving Nogliki in Sakhalin Oblast, Russia. Following upgrades by oil and gas companies working on projects in the region, the airport opened to the public in 2004. It is served by the airline Aurora as of December 2017.

History
After obtaining temporary approval from regional authorities, the Nogliki airport opened for public use in October 2004. ExxonMobil and Sakhalin Energy, oil and gas companies working on projects in the region, had upgraded the airport. Sakhalin Energy stated that it spent about US$19 million on the upgrade works. The federal government revoked the approval in 2005, closing the airport to fixed-wing aircraft although helicopters could still land. The airport has since reopened to all aircraft.

Infrastructure
The Nogliki airport has one runway, which measures .

Airlines and destinations

References

External links

Airports in Sakhalin Oblast